"Don't Let Daddy Kiss Me" is a song by the British rock band Motörhead. It was written by Lemmy and released as a single in 1993. The song is covered with "Born to Raise Hell", which was released as a separate single, and "Death or Glory". All three songs are from the  Bastards album.

The song is about child sexual abuse, and was one of Lemmy's favourites. Written three years before being recorded, Lemmy offered it to Lita Ford and Joan Jett, amongst others and although much enthusiasm was received, he ended up recording it himself.

Single track listing
 "Don't Let Daddy Kiss Me" (Lemmy)
 "Born to Raise Hell" (Lemmy)
 "Death or Glory" (Lemmy, Würzel, Phil Campbell, Mikkey Dee)

Personnel
 Würzel - Guitar
 Phil "Wizzo" Campbell - Guitar
 Lemmy - Bass, vocals
 Mikkey Dee - Drums

References 

Motörhead songs
1993 singles
Songs about child abuse
Songs about fathers
Songs about kissing
Rock ballads
Songs written by Lemmy
1993 songs
Song recordings produced by Howard Benson